Reginald John "Jack" Birney (26 September 1928 – 1 January 1995) was an Australian politician. Born in Sydney, he was a barrister before entering politics. In 1975, he was elected to the Australian House of Representatives as the Liberal member for Phillip. He held the seat until his defeat in 1983 by Jeannette McHugh. Birney died in 1995. His youngest son, Matt Birney, was Western Australian Opposition Leader from 2005 to 2006.

References

Liberal Party of Australia members of the Parliament of Australia
Members of the Australian House of Representatives for Phillip
Members of the Australian House of Representatives
1928 births
1995 deaths
20th-century Australian politicians